"" (a play on the Vietnamese pronunciation of "nCoV") is a song by Vietnamese singers Min and Erik. The song was written and composed by Khắc Hưng, in support of a health communication campaign initiated by the Vietnamese National Institute of Occupational and Environmental Health (NIOEH), part of the Vietnamese Ministry of Health, in response to the COVID-19 pandemic in Vietnam. The campaign, which also included an animated music video and a dance challenge on YouTube, was created and managed by Hoang Diem Huyen from NIOEH. The dance was choreographed by Quang Dang and performed by Quang Dang and Minh Quan.

Background and composition   
"" is based on a V-pop song, "", originally released by Min and Erik on May 23, 2017. The updated song was produced and released in response to the COVID-19 pandemic in Vietnam as a means to promote hygiene habits against COVID-19, including washing hands, not touching one's face and keeping their surroundings clean.

Khắc Hưng was contacted by Hoàng Diễm Huyền from the NIOEH in early 2020 to compose a song as a means to propagate methods to prevent the virus. However, due to time constraints, the two chose a previously-existing song, "", and subsequently rewrote the lyrics. An accompanying animated music video was produced by Yang Animation Artist and Hoang Diem Huyen.

Music video 
The music video for the song features animated versions of both Min and Erik along with depictions of bright green cartoon virus wearing a crown along with a figure resembling the grim reaper. The video promotes the measures recommended by healthcare professionals, including cleanliness of surroundings, social distancing and hand washing.

Release and reception 

The song was released on Min's YouTube channel on February 23, 2020. An English-language version was released on April 9. It was produced by Khắc Hưng and Mew Amazing. The original Vietnamese song has since seen the addition of subtitles in over 25 languages.

Vietnamese dancer Quang Đăng created the "" dance challenge. In an interview with CBS News, he said that the representative and project lead of the NIOEH campaign asked him to create a dance that could go viral and cause the song to trend. He stated that he was able to choreograph the dance in 15 minutes. The hashtag #GhenCoVyChallenge had since gained over 21.5 million views on the video-sharing app TikTok. Quang Đăng's dance video was also promoted by the United Nations Children's Fund (UNICEF). Various videos of people responding to the challenge had garnered over 2 million views on TikTok.

Comedian and television host John Oliver, host of the American talk show Last Week Tonight with John Oliver, called the song a "genuine club-banger". German weekly Stern praised the song for its ability to spread information in an innovative fashion without underestimating the seriousness of the situation. Huffington Post praised the song for the dance steps in the video. It also received praise from South Korea's Seoul Broadcasting System, while France's BFM TV stated that the song might have helped avert a potential large-scale pandemic devastation in Vietnam.

Following the success of "", other countries have taken to social media to release public service announcements. In Bangkok, Thailand, BTS Skytrain released a video titled "Dance Against The Virus" featuring staff cleaning handrails inside trains and disinfecting surfaces, while in the Philippines, health officials released a video on etiquette related to coughing and social distancing and called people to join the #covidance challenge. The Singaporean government released a video featuring comedian Gurmit Singh talking about hygiene and cleanliness.

The Daily Bruin reported that the English-language department of the University of California, Los Angeles was offering a freshman seminar course on the cultural impact of COVID-19, in which "" and other TikTok dance challenges and viral memes centered around the pandemic were studied.

Cover version 
New York-based indie folk Americana band The Good Morning Nags released a cover version of "" on 11 March. The song uses English-language translations of the original Vietnamese song, with some lyrical alterations to reflect the pandemic situation in the United States. The band said that it wanted to use the song to raise awareness after the virus started spreading in New York. Khắc Hưng commented on the cover version, calling it "really great".

References

External links 

Public service announcements
2020 in Vietnam
COVID-19 pandemic in Vietnam
Songs about the COVID-19 pandemic
Vietnamese songs
2020 songs
2020 singles
Electronic dance music songs
Tropical house songs